Tabor Wielki is a village in the administrative district of Gmina Bralin, within Kępno County, Greater Poland Voivodeship, in west-central Poland.

The village was founded in 1749 as Friedrichstabor by Czech Protestant exiles.

References

Tabor Wielki